The men's 400 metres event at the 1957 World University Games was held at the Stadium Charlety in Paris on 5 and 6 September 1957.

Medalists

Results

Heats
Held on 5 September

Semifinals
Held on 6 September

Final
Held on 6 September

References

Athletics at the 1957 World University Games
1957